This is a list of Croatian television related events from 1989.

Events

Debuts

Television shows

Ending this year

Births
18 September - Ornela Vištica, Bosnian-born actress & model

Deaths